"Livin' for You" is a song recorded by Al Green and co-written by Green and Willie Mitchell. It was the title track of Green's 1973 album Livin' for You.  Released as a single in December of that year, it eventually became Green's fourth single to reach the number one spot on Billboard's R&B Singles Chart, also reached the number nineteen spot on Billboard's Pop Singles Chart. 
The single was Al Green's first release without the involvement of drummer Al Jackson, Jr., who had reunited with his former group, Booker T. & the MG's.

References

1973 singles
1974 singles
Al Green songs
Songs written by Al Green
Songs written by Willie Mitchell (musician)
1973 songs
Hi Records singles
Song recordings produced by Willie Mitchell (musician)